Roland Collombin (born 17 February 1951) is a former World Cup alpine ski racer from Switzerland, a two-time World Cup downhill champion and Olympic silver medalist.

Racing career
Born in Versegères in the canton of Valais, Collombin made his first World Cup top ten finish at age 20 in December 1971 with a seventh place in the downhill at Val-d'Isère, France. Two months later, he won the silver medal in the downhill at the 1972 Winter Olympics at Sapporo, Japan, finishing behind countryman Bernhard Russi.

Collombin dominated the event over the next two World Cup seasons, 1973 and 1974, and won the World Cup season titles in downhill.

In January 1974, Collombin won the month's four downhills in consecutive weeks, which included the two classics: the Lauberhorn at Wengen, Switzerland, and the Hahnenkamm at Kitzbühel, Austria.  Collombin had finished second in the previous two downhills in December 1973 for six consecutive downhill podiums. The repeat win at Kitzbühel was in record time, besting Jean-Claude Killy's mark of 1967, but was Collombin's last finish in international competition. (Franz Klammer of Austria broke the record at Kitzbühel the following year.)

The World Championships were held in Switzerland in February 1974 at St. Moritz. The Swiss team won seven medals at the Olympics two years earlier in Japan, but managed just one at home, a bronze in the women's slalom (by Lise-Marie Morerod). Collombin could not continue his January success; he fell in the downhill and did not finish, but he was 0.45 seconds behind winner David Zwilling before he did fall, maybe a to big margin to take the win.

Injuries
On 8 December 1974, Collombin fell in the season's first downhill at Val-d'Isère and bruised his spine, ending his 1975 season. In his absence, Franz Klammer of Austria won the first of his four straight downhill season titles. Collombin attempted a comeback on 7 December 1975 at Val-d'Isère, but fell in the first training at the same jump as the year before and broke two vertebrae, being paralyzed for two days and ending his racing career. That jump is called »Bosse à Collombin« since that time. Nearly paralyzed, Collombin did not walk again until mid-February, after the 1976 Winter Olympics in Innsbruck. He finished his World Cup career with eight victories and three runner-up finishes, all in downhill.

By now, Mr. Collombin is a vinicultarist, wine merchant and hotelier at Versegères.

After racing
Collombin and his wife Sarah operate a guest house in Versegères, and Collombin also has a product line of wines. In late 2014 Roland and Sarah opened a raclette bar named "La Streif"(in reference to the ski run in Kitzbuehel, Austria, where Collombin won several times), in the Swiss town of Martigny.

World Cup results

Season titles

Season standings

Top Ten Finishes
 8 wins – (8 DH)
 11 podiums – (11 DH)

World championship results 

From 1948 through 1980, the Winter Olympics were also the World Championships for alpine skiing.

Olympic results

References

External links
 
 Roland Collombin World Cup standings at the International Ski Federation
 
 
 Roland Collombin.ch personal site/photo gallery 

Videos
  – Roland Collombin – penultimate  victory – Wengen – 19-Jan-1974
  – Albrecht vs. Collombin – career ending crashes of two Swiss downhillers – (Jan 2009 vs Dec 1975)

Swiss male alpine skiers
Olympic silver medalists for Switzerland
Alpine skiers at the 1972 Winter Olympics
1951 births
Living people
Olympic medalists in alpine skiing
People from Bagnes
People from Entremont district
FIS Alpine Ski World Cup champions
Medalists at the 1972 Winter Olympics
Sportspeople from Valais
20th-century Swiss people